Richard Masao Fujimoto is a computer scientist and researcher in reverse computation, distributed computing, and big data. He is a Regents’ Professor, Emeritus, in the School of Computational Science and Engineering (CSE) at the Georgia Institute of Technology. He was also the founding chair of Georgia Tech's school of CSE. Fujimoto's research has provided the basis for the development of new algorithms and computational techniques for discrete event simulations, including the development of the Georgia Tech Time Warp software, which was adopted for use by MITRE to create a commercial air traffic simulator. Fujimoto also led the development and definition of the time management services in the High Level Architecture (HLA) for modeling and simulation which was standardized under IEEE 1516.

Selected awards
 IEEE Fellow, 2020, "For his work in the field of parallel and distributed discrete event simulation"
 I/ITSEC Fellow, 2019
 ACM Fellow, 2017, "For achievements in modeling and simulations"

References

Living people
Year of birth missing (living people)
American computer scientists
Georgia Tech faculty
Fellows of the Association for Computing Machinery
Fellow Members of the IEEE